Flowerdale may refer to several places:

In Australia
Flowerdale, Tasmania
Flowerdale, Victoria

In Canada
Flowerdale, Alberta

in Scotland
Flowerdale, Scotland, a mountain area and valley near to Gairloch